Mikołaj Łęczycki (coat of arms: Niesobia), in Latin Nicolaus Lancicius (December 10, 1574 – March 30, 1653) was a Polish Jesuit, Catholic theologian, writer and mystic.

Life 
Łęczycki was born near Nesvizh, the son of a printer Daniel of Łęczyca and Katarzyna Gotart. At the age of 18, Łęczycki converted from Calvinism to Catholicism, and persuaded his father to do it as well. On February 17, 1592, he entered the Society of Jesus. He spent several years in Rome, where he was studying and working with Niccolò Orlandini in the congregation's central archive to compile the history of Jesuits. During the stay, he received the holy orders on April 14, 1601. Łęczycki returned to Polish–Lithuanian Commonwealth in 1607, bringing many relics for Jesuit churches. He was a professor at the Vilnius University and Lviv college, the rector in Kalisz and Kraków, then he was working in Nesvizh, Braniewo, and what is now the Czech Republic. He was serving as a provincial for Lithuania and visited Rome several times. He was commonly considered a master of the spiritual life and a worker of miracles such as revelation, prophecy, healing, levitation, psychokinesis and bilocation. He died in Kaunas.

Writings 

He was the author of many theological writings, published together by Jean Bolland in two volumes as Opuscula spiritualia (Antwerp 1650) and separately many times all over Europe. The most important are:
 De piis erga Deum et coelites affectibus – a diary, with several editions under various titles and in translations to Polish, English, French, German and Czech
 Florilegium piarum meditationum (Vilnius 1713)
 Insignis conversio Mariae Bonaventurae monialis Romanae
 De officiis sacerdotum
 De conditionibus boni superioris
 Dissertatio historica et theologica de praestantia Instituti Societatis Jesu
 De recta traducenda adolescentia
 De exteriore corporis compositione
 De humanarum passionum dominio
 Medytacje nowym i doskonałym sposobem na każdy dzień roku rozłożone i na święta znamienitsze (Vilnius 1723)
 Koło rycerskie rocznego obrotu (Vilnius 1727)

See also 
 Kasper Drużbicki
 Daniel Pawłowski
 Tomasz Młodzianowski
 Jan Morawski

References
 Bronisław Natoński, Mikołaj Łęczycki, in Polski Słownik Biograficzny, vol. XVIII, Zakład Narodowy imienia Ossolińskich, Wrocław-Warszawa-Kraków-Gdańsk 1973, p. 347-350
 Ludwik Grzebień, Mikołaj Łęczycki, in Słownik polskich teologów katolickich, vol. II: do 1918, H-Ł, Akademia Teologii Katolickiej, Warszawa 1982, p. 560-566
 Aleksandra Witkowska, Joanna Nastalska, Staropolskie piśmiennictwo hagiograficzne, vol. I: Słownik hagiografów polskich, Wydawnictwo Katolickiego Uniwersytetu Lubelskiego Jana Pawła II, Lublin 2007, p. 139-142

External links
 Works by Mikołaj Łęczycki in digital library Polona

1574 births
1653 deaths
17th-century Latin-language writers
Polish nobility
17th-century Polish Jesuits
Academic staff of Jagiellonian University
Academic staff of Vilnius University
Converts to Roman Catholicism from Calvinism
17th-century Polish philosophers
16th-century Polish Jesuits